Mawdsley is a surname. Notable people with the surname include:

Andrés Aguilar Mawdsley (1924-1995), Venezuelan lawyer and diplomat
Barbara Mawdsley, the name of M, a fictional character in Ian Fleming's James Bond series
Evan Mawdsley (born 1945), British historian
James Mawdsley (trade unionist) (1848–1902), English trade unionist and Conservative Party candidate
James Mawdsley (born 1973), British-Australian human rights activist campaigning for democracy in Burma, catholic priest
Richard Mawdsley (born 1945), American artist known for his work in metalsmithing
Robert Mawdsley (born 1953), British serial killer responsible for the murders of four people

See also
Capt. John Mawdsley House, one of the oldest houses in Newport, Rhode Island
Maudsley
Maudslay (disambiguation)